The Compleat Angler (the spelling is sometimes modernised to The Complete Angler, though this spelling also occurs in first editions) is a book by Izaak Walton. It was first published in 1653 by Richard Marriot in London.
Walton continued to add to it for a quarter of a century. It is a celebration of the art and spirit of fishing in prose and verse.

It was illustrated by Arthur Rackham in 1931.

Background
Walton was born in Stafford and moved to London when he was in his teens in order to learn a trade. 
The Compleat Angler reflects the author's connections with these two locations, especially on the River Dove, Central England that forms the border between Staffordshire and Derbyshire in the Peak District. The book was dedicated to John Offley of Madeley, Staffordshire, and there are references in it to fishing in the English Midlands. However, the work begins with Londoners making a fishing trip up the Lea Valley in Hertfordshire, starting at Tottenham.

Walton was not sympathetic to the Puritan regime of the 1650s and the work has been seen as a reaction to the turbulence of the English Civil War and its aftermath; "the disorder of the present times received muted comment in the work's scenes of harmony", is the view of the Oxford Dictionary of National Biography.
“Study to be Quiet” was one of Izaak Walton's favorite mottos.

Sources
Walton's sources included earlier publications on the subject of fishing, such as the Treatyse of Fysshynge with an Angle included in the Book of Saint Albans. Six verses were quoted from John Dennys's 1613 work The Secrets of Angling.

Editions
The Compleat Angler was published by the bookseller Richard Marriot, whose business was based in Fleet Street near where Walton had a shop. Walton was a friend of Marriot's father John, who had started the business, but was in retirement by the time the book appeared.

The first edition featured dialogue between veteran angler Piscator and student Viator, while later editions change Viator to hunter Venator and added falconer Auceps.

There were a number of editions during the author's lifetime. There was a second edition in 1655, a third in 1661 (identical with that of 1664), a fourth in 1668, and a fifth in 1676. In this last edition, the thirteen chapters of the original had grown to twenty-one, and a second part was added by his friend and brother angler Charles Cotton, who took up Venator where Walton had left him and completed his instruction in fly fishing and the making of flies.

Illustrations
Starting with the first edition, which had anonymous illustrations, the work has inspired artists, for example Arthur Rackham (1931).

References

Sources

  (subscription or member of UK public library required)

External links
 

1653 books
Angling literature
Works about fishing
Books illustrated by Arthur Rackham